"The Human Barrier" was an American television play that was broadcast by CBS on July 29, 1957, as part of the television series, Westinghouse Studio One Summer Theatre.  The production reviews the investigation into the crash of an Air Force test plane and the human limitations on supersonic and high altitude flight.

Plot
The production examines the "human barrier", a term used at the time to describe the human limitations on supersonic and high altitude flight.

While flying an experimental plane at 70,000 feet, an Air Force test pilot, Capt. Gene Lipton, crashes and cannot recall the moments leading up to the crash. A detailed accident investigation and a hearing before a board of officers concludes that the crash was caused by human error and that the plane's mechanical systems were sound. However, the investigation also shows that the location of the radio, on the floor behind the pilot, resulted in pilot vertigo at high altitude and speed, demonstrating a need for a design change.

In the break between the first and second acts, John Cameron Swayze presented a history of aviation and of the United States Air Force.

Chief of the Air Force Thomas D. White appears in an epilogue where he reviews that Air Forces's flight safety programs.

Cast
The following actors received screen credit for their performances:

 John Cameron Swayze, narrator
 Skip Homeier as Capt. Gene Lipton
 Pat Hingle as Major Bergman
 John Beal as Major Saks
 Patricia Smith as Ginny Lipton
 Philip Bourneuf as Gen. Gerringer
 Russell Hardie as Mr. Woodward
 Frank Campanella as Major Richards
 Ross Martin as Lt. Maxwell
 Fred J. Scolay as Sgt. Buckley
 Tom Middleton as Capt. Rice
 John Shellie as Mr. Hopewell
 Billy Quinn as Craig Hopewell
 Carlton Colyer as The Hospital Orderly
 William Clemens as The Air Policeman
 Jim Boles as Mr. Clinton
 Florence Anglin as Mrs. Clinton
 Henderson Forsythe as Dr. Barnes
 Peter von Zerneck as Dr. Heinz
 Thomas D. White as himself

Production
The television play was presented in honor of the golden anniversary of the United States Air Force.

It was produced by Norman Felton and directed by Perry Lafferty. It was written by Richard DeRoy and narrated by John Cameron Swayze. The settings were designed by Neil DeLuca.

The production assisted by the Directorate of Flight Safety Research of the U.S. Air Force and Brigadier General Joseph D. Caldara, the Air Force's director of flight safety research. Major Vernon R. Stutts served as a technical advisor.

Reception
The Chicago Tribune called the play  "interesting tho tedious"  and described the characters were "stock" and some of the dialogue "too technical."

Critic Ogden Dwight called it overly technical and dramatically lacking.

References

1957 American television episodes
1957 television plays
Aviation accidents and incidents in fiction
United States Air Force in fiction
Studio One (American TV series)